Piz Linard is a pyramid-shaped mountain of the Swiss Alps. At 3,410 m it is the highest peak of the Silvretta mountain range.

It was first climbed on August 1, 1835, by the  geologist and naturalist Oswald Heer led by Johann Madutz.

There is a legend that a man of name "Chounard" reached the summit in 1572 carrying a large golden cross; however, the cross has never been found.

Piz Linard is located between the valleys of Val Lavinuoz (east) and Val Saglains (west), both part of the basin of the Inn river in the Engadine valley.

See also
 List of most isolated mountains of Switzerland

References

External links

 Piz Linard on Summitpost
 Piz Linard on Hikr

Mountains of Graubünden
Mountains of the Alps
Alpine three-thousanders
Mountains of Switzerland
Silvretta Alps
Zernez